This is the List of German Skeleton Champions since 1914.

Men

Women

Statistics 

bold - still active athletes

Men

Women

External links 
 Statistics at the BSD-Site
 Statistics at Sport-komplett
 Statistics at  Eiskanal

List of champions
Champions, list